This page covers both 2007 album "All the Lovely Losers" and its predecessor, the 2005 album "The Better Part of Me" because of similarity between the two albums 

All The Lovely Losers is a music album by Jason Gray released March 6, 2007. It is his fifth solo record and his first major label national release with Centricity Music. It was produced by Matt Patrick and Nate Sabin.

Eight tracks of the 12-track album All the Lovely Losers are taken from Jason's 2005 independently released album The Better Part of Me with altered track-listing. The other four tracks, namely "Sing Through Me", "You Are Mercy", "Into the Mystery" and "Someday (The Butterfly)" are new tracks not found in the earlier album.

The album The Better Part of Me had been released by the singer-songwriter independently prior to signing to the record label Centricity Music. The album was credited to Jason Gay prior to Jason Gay changing his artistic name to Jason Gray in 2006 with signing with Centricity.

Track listing

2005: The Better Part of Me
Credited as Jason Gay
"Blessed Be"
"This Far"
"Weak"
"The Cut"
"I'm Not Going Down"
"Someday"
"Listen to Your Life"
"Move"
"You Are & You Are Good"
"Grace"
"Everything I Own"

2007: All the Lovely Losers
Credited as Jason Gray

References 

2005 albums
2007 albums
Centricity Music albums
Jason Gray (musician) albums